Mahmoud Fathalla Abdou Ibrahim El Henawy (born 13 February 1982) is an Egyptian former professional footballer who played as a centre-back.

International career
Fathalla represented the Egypt national team in two Africa Cup of Nations tournaments, winning it twice: in 2008 and 2010.

Career statistics

International
Scores and results list Egypt's goal tally first, score column indicates score after each Fathalla goal.

Honours
Zamalek
 Egypt Cup: 2008, 2013, 2014

Egypt
 Africa Cup of Nations: 2008, 2010

Individual
 Lebanese Premier League Best Goal: 2017–18

References

External links
 
 

1982 births
Living people
People from Dakahlia Governorate
Egyptian footballers
Association football central defenders
Ghazl El Mahalla SC players
Zamalek SC players
Tala'ea El Gaish SC players
El Entag El Harby SC players
Nejmeh SC players
Al Mokawloon Al Arab SC players
Nogoom FC players
Egyptian Premier League players
Lebanese Premier League players
Egypt international footballers
2008 Africa Cup of Nations players
2009 FIFA Confederations Cup players
2010 Africa Cup of Nations players
Africa Cup of Nations-winning players
Egyptian expatriate footballers
Egyptian expatriate sportspeople in Lebanon
Expatriate footballers in Lebanon